Sarah Carter  is a Canadian historian. She is Professor and the Henry Marshall Tory Chair at the University of Alberta in both the Department of History and Classics and the Faculty of Native Studies with noted specialties in Indigenous and women's history.

Career and honours 
Carter grew up in Saskatoon and as a student worked summer jobs at historic sites Fort Walsh and Fort Battleford. Carter has related that the exclusion of colonial history at such sites was a motivating factor in her pursuing further studies in history. She received her Bacherlor of Arts in 1976 and her Master of Arts in 1981, both from the University of Saskatchewan, and her PhD from the University of Manitoba in 1987. Before joining the University of Alberta in 2006, Carter had taught at the University of Calgary, the University of Winnipeg, and the University of Manitoba.

Carter's research, from her doctoral dissertation that became her first book, Lost Harvests, has focused on Western Canada's colonial history, and in particular the exclusion of Indigenous peoples and women throughout colonization and settlement of the Prairies. Her work has been recognized as fundamentally re-shaping historical understandings of the Prairies. Her work has been influential beyond academia, and her research was, for example, important to the writing of the final report of the National Inquiry into Murdered Indigenous Women and Girls.

Carter has won numerous accolades throughout her career. Lost Harvests won the 1991 Clio Prize for the Prairies from the Canadian Historical Association, as did her 2008 book The Importance of Being Monogamous and her 2016 book Imperial Plots. The latter also won the Association's 2017 Sir John A. Macdonald Prize (now the CHA Best Scholarly Book in Canadian History Prize), one of the Governor General's History Awards, awarded to the book making the most significant contribution to Canadian history. Carter contributed an introduction the 2006 edition of Georgina Binnie-Clark's 1914 book Wheat and Woman. In 2007 Carter was elected a Fellow of the Royal Society of Canada. In 2020, she was awarded a prestigious Killam Prize from the Canada Council, which recognizes substantial and distinguished contributions over a significant period to Canadian scholarly research.

Selected works 

 Lost Harvests: Prairie Indian Reserve Farmers and Government Policy. McGill-Queen's Press, 1990.
 The True Spirit and Original Intent of Treaty 7. With Treaty 7 Tribal Council, Walter Hildebrandt, and Dorothy First Rider. McGill-Queen's Press, 1996.
 Capturing Women: The Manipulation of Cultural Imagery in Canada's Prairie West. McGill-Queen's Press, 1997.
 Aboriginal People and Colonizers of Western Canada. University of Toronto Press, 1999.
 The Importance of Being Monogamous: Marriage and Nation Building in Western Canada. Athabasca University Press and University of Alberta Press, 2008.
 Imperial Plots: Women, Land, and the Spadework of British Colonialism on the Canadian Prairies. University of Manitoba Press, 2016.

References

External links 
 Profile at the University of Alberta

Canadian women historians
Fellows of the Royal Society of Canada
21st-century Canadian historians
Academic staff of the University of Alberta
Living people
Year of birth missing (living people)
20th-century Canadian historians